Lafrenière is a French family name.

Notable people 
 Alexis Lafrenière (born 2001), Canadian ice hockey player
 Jean-Baptiste Lafrenière (1874–1912), Canadian pianist, composer
 Gilbert LaFreniere (born 1934), American ecological philosopher
 Réjean Lafrenière (1935–2016), Canadian politician
 Robert Lafrenière (1924–2012), Canadian lawyer, politician

French-language surnames